The Shadow Lord Chancellor is the member of the British Shadow Cabinet who shadows the Lord Chancellor, an office which has existed since the Norman Conquest. Since 2010, the officeholder has jointly held the title Shadow Secretary of State for Justice. The current Shadow Lord Chancellor is Steve Reed.

Shadow Lord Chancellors

Notes

References

Official Opposition (United Kingdom)